Fra' Martin de Redin (Pamplona, 1579 – Malta, 6 February 1660) was a Spanish military and political figure, and the 58th Prince and Grand Master of the Order of Malta. He became Grand Prior of the Order of Malta of Navarra in 1641, and Viceroy of Sicily in 1656.

He was elected Grand Master of the Knights Hospitaller in 1657 after the death of Giovanni Paolo Lascaris. During his rule, he commissioned the building of 13 de Redin watch towers around the coast of Malta. These towers created a line of communication around the island to give warning of the approach of corsairs and pirates.

De Redin also created a corps of 4000 musketeers, and brought in food and supplies from Sicily when Malta suffered a shortage during his reign.

External links
 Coins of Grandmaster Martin de Redin

Grand Masters of the Knights Hospitaller
Knights of Malta
Spanish generals
Burials at Saint John's Co-Cathedral
1579 births
1660 deaths
17th-century Spanish people
Viceroys of Sicily